Mölln (Lauenburg) station is located in the Mölln in the district of Herzogtum Lauenburg in the German state of Schleswig-Holstein. The first station building was opened simultaneously with the Lübeck–Lüneburg railway on 16 October 1851, but was later demolished.

The present building was erected in 1899; at the same time the Mölln–Hollenbek railway was built to connect with the Hagenow Land–Bad Oldesloe railway (also known as the Kaiserbahn or "Imperial Railway"). The Mölln–Hollenbek line was closed in 1959. Today only the Lübeck-Lüneburg railway is still in operation.

Infrastructure

The entrance building, which was built in 1851 with Prussian architectural features, is closed as a result of vandalism. The unused part of the entrance building formerly housed the Lok-Haus restaurant and a kiosk.

The station area was renovated in 2008. The old semaphore signals were replaced by colour light signals and the trackbed of track 2 was renewed and the level crossing was completely rebuilt.

Rail services

The station has two tracks, but in December 2008, only track 1 was used by passenger traffic since the crossing in Ratzeburg has been reactivated and trains now cross there. Freight traffic only occasionally uses the line.

Three regional bus routes depart from the station forecourt and connect the station with central Mölln among other places.

Notes

References 

  
 

Railway stations in Schleswig-Holstein
Railway stations in Germany opened in 1851
1851 establishments in Denmark
Buildings and structures in Herzogtum Lauenburg